Gwyneth of the Welsh Hills is a 1921 British silent romance film directed by Floyd Martin Thornton and starring Madge Stuart, Eille Norwood and Lewis Gilbert. It was based on a novel by Edith Nepean.

Cast
 Madge Stuart as Gwyneth 
 Eille Norwood as Lord Pryse 
 Lewis Gilbert as Davydd Owen 
 Harvey Braban as Gwylim Rhys 
 R. Henderson Bland as Shadrack Morgan 
 Elizabeth Herbert as Megan Powers 
 Gladys Jennings as Blodwen 
 Dalton Somers as Denis 
 Joseph R. Tozer as Evan Pryse 
 Robert Vallis as But Lloyd 
 Sam Wilkinson as Shores 
 Mrs. Hubert Willis as Jan Rhys

References

Bibliography
 Low, Rachael. History of the British Film, 1918-1929. George Allen & Unwin, 1971.

External links

1921 films
1920s romance films
British romance films
British silent feature films
1920s English-language films
Films directed by Floyd Martin Thornton
Stoll Pictures films
Films based on British novels
Films set in Wales
British black-and-white films
1920s British films